Tinte is a town in the Dutch province of South Holland. It is a part of the municipality of Voorne aan Zee, and lies about 6 km north of Hellevoetsluis.

The statistical area "Tinte", which also can include the surrounding countryside, has a population of around 537 (2011).

References

Populated places in South Holland
Voorne aan Zee